The Sea Otter Classic is a bicycling and outdoor sports festival and exposition held each spring since 1991 at the WeatherTech Raceway Laguna Seca in Monterey, California.  The four-day event is considered the world's largest cycling festival, drawing nearly 10,000 professional and amateur athletes and 74,000 fans.  The Sea Otter Classic is named in honor of the southern sea otter, an indigenous mammal which flourishes along the neighboring Pacific coast.

The Sea Otter Classic was founded by Frank Yohannan and Lou Rudolph. The inaugural event was held 06–07 April 1991. The first two events were held under the name Laguna Seca Challenge. The event name was changed to the Sea Otter Classic in 1993.

In August 2021, Frank Yohannan, who has owned and operated the Sea Otter Classic for more than 30 years, found a new owner for the event — Life Time, Inc., a multi-billion dollar fitness and event company. Despite the change in ownership Yohannan will remain as director.

Lists of Winners

References

Mountain biking events in the United States
Festivals in California
Sports in Monterey County, California
Sports festivals in the United States
1991 establishments in California
Recurring sporting events established in 1991